Robert Jarman is an Australian theatre artist based in Hobart, Tasmania. Primarily a director and actor, he is also a writer and designer.

Education
Jarman studied English and Drama at the University of Sydney, where he participated extensively with the Sydney University Dramatic Society, performing, writing and directing shows varying in style from Shakespeare to experimental political cabaret.

Career
In the late 1980s, Jarman moved to Hobart where he quickly established himself as one of the leading entities within the Tasmanian arts industry.

He directed the Australasian Premiere of Philip Glass's opera Hydrogen Jukebox at the Tasmanian Conservatorium of Music where he is currently the lecturer in Music Theatre.

He has collaborated extensively with composers including Raffæle Marcellino and Matthew Dewey.

Productions

2019 The Protecting Veil. ‘The Protecting Veil’ takes inspiration and incorporates material from ‘The Seven Sacraments of Nicholas Poussin’ written and performed by Neil Bartlett, first produced at The London Hospital, produced by Artangel, London, July 1, 1997.

Honours
In 2001 he was awarded the Australian Centenary of Federation Medal for services to the performing arts.

References

Living people
Australian theatre directors
People from Hobart
Year of birth missing (living people)